Joseph L. Sheeketski (April 15, 1908 – April 22, 1995) was an American football player, coach, and college athletics administrator.  He served as the head football coach at the College of the Holy Cross from 1939 to 1941 and at the University of Nevada, Reno from 1947 to 1950, compiling a career college football record of 39–29–3.

Early life and playing career
Sheeketski attended prep school in Shadyside, Ohio.  He played halfback at the University of Notre Dame from 1930 to 1932 and graduated from the university in 1933.

Coaching career
From 1933 to 1938, Sheeketski served as the backfield coach at the College of the Holy Cross in Worcester, Massachusetts, working under fellow Notre Dame alumnus, Eddie Anderson.  Sheeketski succeeded Anderson as head coach in 1939 when Anderson left for the University of Iowa.  Sheeketski was a special agent for the Federal Bureau of Investigation from 1942 to 1945.  After World War II, Sheeketski returned to his alma mater as an assistant football coach for part of the 1945 season.  The following year, he reunited with Anderson at Iowa and coached the line for the Hawkeyes.

Head coaching record

References

1908 births
1995 deaths
Dayton Flyers football coaches
Educators from Ohio
Federal Bureau of Investigation agents
Iowa Hawkeyes football coaches
Holy Cross Crusaders football coaches
Nevada Wolf Pack athletic directors
Nevada Wolf Pack football coaches
New York Yanks coaches
Notre Dame Fighting Irish football coaches
Notre Dame Fighting Irish football players
People from Belmont County, Ohio
Players of American football from Ohio
Players of American football from Pennsylvania